Small Cajal body-specific RNA 26A is a protein that in humans is encoded by the SCARNA26A gene.

References